Sierra is a Spanish word meaning mountain chain and saw, from Latin serra. The corresponding word in Portuguese, Catalan and Latin is serra.  This name is used for various mountain ranges in Spanish-speaking and other countries (with the word serra used in Portuguese-speaking countries).

Sierra or Sierras may refer to:

Argentina
 Sierra de Córdoba, in the central region of the country 
 Antofagasta de la Sierra, a volcanic field
 Sierra Nevada de Lagunas Bravas, on the border of Argentina and Chile
 Sierra de la Ventana (mountains), Buenos Aires province

Brazil
 Serra do Mar, in the country's southeast

Chile
 Sierra Nevada (stratovolcano), La Araucanía Region
 Sierra Nevada de Lagunas Bravas, on the border of Argentina and Chile

Colombia
 Sierra Nevada de Santa Marta
 Sierra Nevada del Cocuy

Ecuador
 Sierra Negra (Galápagos), Galápagos Province, Ecuador

Mexico
 Sierra de Juárez, Baja California
 Sierra Madre del Sur, in the country's south
 Sierra Madre Occidental, in the northwest of the country
 Sierra Madre Oriental, in the northeast of the country 
 Sierra Nevada (Mexico), part of the Trans-Mexican Volcanic Belt
 Sierra San Pedro Mártir, Baja California
 Sierra Negra, Puebla, Mexico

The Philippines
 Sierra Madre (Philippines), on the island of Luzon

Portugal
 Serra da Estrela, in the north central region of the country
 Serra de Montejunto Protected Landscape, in the west region of the country
 Serra da Vila, in the west region of the country; see Castle of Carrazeda de Ansiães
 Serra do Socorro, in the west region of the country; see Mafra, Portugal

Spain
 Sierra de Gata, in the west region of the country
 Sierra de Gredos, near the central region of the country
 Sierra de Guadarrama, in the central part of the country
 Sierra de Mijas, in the south region of the country
 Sierra Morena, in the country's south
 Sierra Nevada (Spain), in the southeast region of the country
 Sierra de la Demanda, northern Iberian Peninsula

United States
 Sierra Ancha, central Arizona
 Sierra Blanca (New Mexico)
 Sierra Estrella, southwestern Arizona
 Sierra Madre Mountains (California), southwestern California
 Sierra Nevada (U.S.), California and Nevada

Uruguay

 Sierra Carapé, in the central part of the country

Venezuela
 Sierra Nevada de Merida

See also 
 High Sierra (disambiguation)
 Mountain range
 Serra (disambiguation)
 Sierra (disambiguation)

Oronyms